Hoplestigma pierreanum is a species of plant in the Boraginaceae family. It is endemic to Cameroon. Its natural habitat is subtropical or tropical dry forests. It is threatened by habitat loss.

References

Flora of Cameroon
Boraginaceae
Critically endangered plants
Taxonomy articles created by Polbot